Rugby is a village in the Southern Tablelands region of New South Wales, Australia.

The village is set in an area of thick scrub and is known for raising merino sheep. The general store and post office have closed, the school, established over 125 years ago, closed in 2018.

The village was founded in 1830. It was originally called Mewburn after a local settler family.

The village contains several buildings which are considered to have local heritage significance including: The Colonial Inn, Rugby General Store, Rugby Police Station (1922-1945), the Rugby Homestead,  Rugby Public School(1914-2018), the Rugby Hall (1933), the St Vigil (Catholic) & St Aidan (Anglian) churches.The old granite stone Police Station later became the teacher's residence for the school. The cells became bedrooms for the teacher's children.

The Rugby Memorial Gates at the showground are the site of the local ANZAC day commemoration.

References

External links

Towns in New South Wales
Southern Tablelands
Hilltops Council